The 2016 Women's International Tournament of Spain was the 20th edition of the Women's International Tournament Of Spain, held in Elda, Spain between 25–27 November as a friendly handball tournament organised by the Royal Spanish Handball Federation as a preparation of the host nation to the 2016 European Women's Handball Championship.

Results

Round robin
All times are local (UTC+1).

Final standing

References

External links
RFEBM Official Website

International Tournament of Spain
2016 in Spanish sport
Handball competitions in Spain
2016–17 in Spanish handball